Balmori may refer to:
Diana Balmori (1932–2016), Spanish landscape and urban designer
Jesús Balmori (1887–1948), Filipino journalist, playwright, and poet
Santos Balmori (1899–1992), Spanish-Mexican painter
Polideportivo Carlos Martínez Balmori, an indoor arena in Mineral de la Reforma, Mexico

Spanish-language surnames